The 2014 UTEP Miners football team represented the University of Texas at El Paso in the 2014 NCAA Division I FBS football season. This was the second year for head coach Sean Kugler both with UTEP and overall. They were a member of the West Division of Conference USA. The Miners played their home games in El Paso, Texas at the Sun Bowl Stadium. They finished the season 7–6, 5–3 in C-USA play to finish in a tie for second place in the West Division. They were invited to the New Mexico Bowl where they lost to Utah State. UTEP averaged 28,377 fans per game.

This would be the last season the Miners finished with a winning record until the 2021 season

Schedule

Schedule Source:
ASN games could air on KFOX or KDBC.

Game summaries

New Mexico

Texas Tech

New Mexico State

Kansas State

Louisiana Tech

Old Dominion

UTSA

Southern Miss

WKU

North Texas

Rice

Middle Tennessee

Utah State–New Mexico Bowl

Coaching staff

References

UTEP
UTEP Miners football seasons
UTEP Miners football